Wardenclyffe Tower is the seventh studio album by guitarist Allan Holdsworth, released in 1992 through Restless Records (United States) and JMS–Cream Records (Europe), and in 1993 through Polydor Records (Japan); a remastered edition was reissued in 2007 through Eidolon Efformation, containing three bonus tracks (alternative versions of "Tokyo Dream" from 1983's Road Games and "The-Unmerry-Go-Round" from 1985's Metal Fatigue) which were previously only available on the Japanese release.

The album's title is a reference to the Wardenclyffe Tower, or Tesla Tower, designed by inventor Nikola Tesla in 1901 and located in Shoreham, New York. "Zarabeth" is named after a character in the Star Trek episode "All Our Yesterdays".

Critical reception

Daniel Gioffre at AllMusic awarded Wardenclyffe Tower 1.5 stars out of 5, describing it as "formless" and "not very compelling", and being of value to Holdsworth completists rather than casual listeners. He nonetheless noted "Against the Clock", "Dodgy Boat" and the title track as highlights.

Track listing

Personnel
Allan Holdsworth – guitar, SynthAxe, mixing, production
Naomi Star – vocals
Steve Hunt – keyboard (tracks 1, 2, 4, 5)
Gordon Beck – keyboard (tracks 9–11)
Chad Wackerman – drums (tracks 1, 3, 5, 7, 9–11), keyboard (track 7)
Gary Husband – drums (tracks 2, 4), keyboard (track 3)
Vinnie Colaiuta – drums (track 6)
Jimmy Johnson – bass
Joel Schnebelt – spoken vocals
Robert Feist – engineering
Gordon Davis – mixing

References

External links
Wardenclyffe Tower at therealallanholdsworth.com (archived)
Allan Holdsworth "Wardenclyffe Tower" at Guitar Nine

Allan Holdsworth albums
1992 albums
Restless Records albums
Nikola Tesla